"Last Summer" is the fourth single from Start Something, the second album by the Welsh rock band Lostprophets. The previous singles, "Burn Burn", "Last Train Home" and "Wake Up (Make a Move)" had all been highly successful on both sides of the Atlantic so this single was under similar pressure; it reached number 13 in the UK Singles Chart. The song describes the band members enjoying memories past of visiting towns in South Wales such as the seaside town of Porthcawl.

The song's B-side, "Sweet Dreams My LA Ex", is a cover of a song by English popstar, and former member of S Club 7, Rachel Stevens.

Music video 

The music video, directed by The Malloys, shows lead singer Ian Watkins driving around Venice, California on the last day of the summer school term. He is driving a car with the plate number 2BAI222. The same plate number is featured in episode 1 of Numb3rs and episode 1 in the second season of The OC. As Watkins reaches his destination, the beach, he then goes back to the beginning and drives past the school again but in a different decade — the '70s, '80s, and the present. Around the 3:12 mark, lead singer Daryl Palumbo and bassist Jarvis Morgan Holden of Glassjaw and Head Automatica, respectively (Palumbo was a member of both bands), can be seen walking in front of the school. Also at the 2:04 mark, the metal band Steel Panther (performing at the time under the name Metal Skool) are seen in front of the school.

Track listing

Personnel 

 Ian Watkins – lead vocals
 Lee Gaze – lead guitar
 Mike Lewis – rhythm guitar
 Stuart Richardson – bass guitar
 Jamie Oliver – synth, turntables, samples, vocals
 Mike Chiplin – drums, percussion

Chart positions

References

External links
Official clip

2004 singles
Lostprophets songs
Music videos directed by The Malloys
Song recordings produced by Eric Valentine
2004 songs
Columbia Records singles

no:Last Summer